The women's heptathlon at the 2013 World Championships in Athletics was held at the Luzhniki Stadium Moskva RUSSIA on 12–13 August.

Records
Prior to the competition, the records were as follows:

Qualification standards

Schedule

Results

100 metres hurdles
Wind: −0.6, −0.4, −0.2, −0.6 m/s.

High jump
The high jump was started at 09:30.

Shot put
The shot put was held at 18:45.

200 metres
Wind:Heat 1: −0.2, Heat 2: −0.1, Heat 3: −0.2, Heat 4: 0.0, Heat 5: 0.0 m/s.

Long jump
The long jump was held at 07:30.

Javelin throw
The javelin throw was held at 09:10.

800 metres
The 800 metres were held at 20.10.

Final standings

References

External links
Heptathlon results at IAAF website

Heptathlon
Heptathlon at the World Athletics Championships
2013 in women's athletics